For the location in Florida see Island Grove, Florida

Island Grove is the name of a convention center, public park and fairgrounds complex in Greeley, Colorado, United States.  It consists of the following facilities:

Events Center
The Events Center is a 5,000-seat indoor arena which opened in 2006. It is used not only for sporting events but also conventions, concerts, livestock and trade shows, banquets, and other special events. It features a  lobby with concession stands and a ticket office.

Bunkhouse
The Bunkhouse was originally built as Greeley's city hall.  It contains  of meeting space and a  deck.

The 4-H Building
There is also a  kitchen and a permanent stage.

Pro Rodeo Arena
The 9,410-seat outdoor stadium at Island Grove is used primarily for rodeos and can seat up to 15,000 for concerts.  Auto racing is also held at the stadium.  There are several luxury suites as well as four ticket booths.

Pavilion
The Island Grove Pavilion was built in 2002 and contains  of space for outdoor events.

Livestock Building
The  Livestock Building, which seats up to 3,000, can also be used as an indoor arena.  Shows, sales, rodeos and other events are held here.

Exhibition Building
The Exhibition Building contains  of space and contains a small lobby and meeting room.  It is used for trade shows, conventions and meetings seating up to 2,100.

There are also five softball fields, an outdoor museum known as Centennial Village, and a swimming pool.

See also
List of convention centers in the United States

External links
Official page

Indoor arenas in Colorado
Convention centers in Colorado
Sports venues in Colorado
Music venues in Colorado
Greeley, Colorado
Buildings and structures in Weld County, Colorado
Tourist attractions in Weld County, Colorado
Multi-purpose stadiums in the United States